La Nuit sur l'étang is a Canadian music festival, held annually in Sudbury, Ontario.

Established in 1973 by Fernand Dorais and a group of students from Laurentian University who were established as the Coopérative des artistes du Nouvel-Ontario, the festival presents a concert program of francophone musical artists over a night. Franco-Ontarian poets and authors may also give short readings between musical performances.

The festival also stages an annual competition for new and emerging Franco-Ontarian bands, La Brunante. The winner of each year's La Brunante is given a slot on the Nuit sur l'étang bill.

The festival offices are slated to move in 2022 to the new Place des Arts facility in downtown Sudbury.

References

External links
 La Nuit sur l'étang

Music festivals in Ontario
Festivals in Greater Sudbury
Franco-Ontarian organizations
Music festivals established in 1973
Rock festivals in Canada
Pop music festivals in Canada